Gboyo is a river of the Central African Republic. It flows through the town of Bakouma.

The Gboyo is a potentially excellent source for hydro electric power in Bakouma. The pico hydro power station (PCH) is situated on the left bank of the river.

Sources 

 Esi-africa.com

Rivers of the Central African Republic